The 192nd Wing (192 WG), also referred to as the 192D Wing, is a unit of the Virginia Air National Guard and the United States Air Force, stationed at Joint Base Langley-Eustis, Virginia. If activated to federal service, the 192 WG is gained by Air Combat Command (ACC).

Etymology
192D Wing is the official military nomenclature of the unit and it is commonly referred to as the 192nd Wing. It is often interchanged within military writing and speech, either way, without a specific choice of nomenclature. The Air Force Instruction Publication (Air Force Instruction 38–101), Chapter 5; "Procedures for Naming and Numbering Units", figure 5.1, gives an example of using 2nd Bomb Wing, and section 5.4.2; "Unit Kind", gives an example of 3rd Wing. Section 5.3.4. – Reserves numbers 101 through 299 for Air National Guard units giving position for the unit numbering.

Mission
The 192nd WG is an Air National Guard unit co-located with the active duty 1st Fighter Wing at Joint Base Langley-Eustis, Virginia. The 192nd Wing has a dual mission: the federal mission is to maintain a well-trained, well-equipped unit to be available for prompt mobilization during war and provide assistance during national emergencies (such as natural disasters or civil disturbances); under the state mission, the 192 WG provides protection of life, property and preserves peace, order and public safety. These missions are accomplished through emergency relief support during natural disasters such as floods, earthquakes and forest fires; search and rescue operations; support to civil defense authorities; maintenance of vital public services and counter-drug operations.

Units
The 192nd Wing consists of the following units:
 192nd Operations Group
149th Fighter Squadron
192nd Operations Support Squadron
192nd Intelligence Squadron
185th Cyberspace Operations Squadron
200th Weather Flight
192nd Maintenance Group
192nd Aircraft Maintenance Squadron
192nd Maintenance Squadron
192nd Mission Support Group
192nd Support Squadron
192nd Security Forces Squadron
203rd REDHORSE Squadron
 192nd Medical Group
Detachment 1
Guard Medical Unit

History

On 15 October 1962, the Virginia Air National Guard's 149th Tactical Fighter Squadron (149 TFS) was authorized to expand to a group level organization and the 192nd Tactical Fighter Group (192 TFG) was established by the National Guard Bureau. The 149th TFS becoming the group's flying squadron. Other squadrons assigned into the group were the 192nd Headquarters, 192nd Material Squadron (Maintenance), 192nd Combat Support Squadron, and the 192nd USAF Dispensary.

During 1971, the 192nd was assigned the F-105D Thunderchief, a battle-hardened supersonic fighter-bomber that was the backbone of America's fighter element during the Vietnam War. The group's special tasks during the next decade included several deployments to Red Flag live-fire exercises at Nellis AFB, Nevada and a deployment to RAF Lakenheath, England, in 1976.

In 1981, the unit converted to the A-7D Corsair II, a subsonic jet designed for close-air support. The decade long A-7 era included several deployments to Howard AFB, Panama to aid the defense of the Panama Canal and two trips to Norway, in 1985 and 1989.

A few weeks later, a Virginia ANG contingent competed in Gunsmoke '85, the Air Force's tactical fighter competition, and the 192nd was named the world's "Best A-7 Unit". The 192nd also earned the General Spruance Safety Award and was recognized as having the best operational readiness inspection in the Ninth Air Force during 1985. In 1987, the 192nd earned its first USAF Outstanding Unit Award.

In 1991, the 192nd became the first Air National Guard unit to receive the Air Force's upgraded Fighting Falcon—the F-16C/D. The unit was initially assigned 24 single-seat F-16C models and two F-16D models. By early 1994, defense cutbacks reduced the unit's assigned inventory to 18 F-16s, and eventually to 15. Conversion to the F-16 airframe required the 192nd to build a $2 million "hush house", a special noise-suppression hangar, to test the jets' engines without bothering neighbors. The 192nd's designation shortened during 1992, from 192nd Tactical Fighter Group to 192nd Fighter Group, reflecting the retirement of former Tactical Air Command (TAC) and creation of the new multi-role mission Air Combat Command (ACC).

After the 192nd became fully operational with the F-16, it was chosen as the lead unit in a four-state Air National Guard F-16 "rainbow" detachment deployment to Incirlik Air Base, Turkey to support Operation Provide Comfort II. Between 1 December 1993, and 15 January 1994, ANG pilots patrolled the no-fly zone over northern Iraq to prevent Iraqi forces from inflicting damage on the villages of Kurdish minorities. This marked the first time Air National Guard units were called to active duty in the Middle East, following Iraq's defeat in 1991. The unit returned to Incirlik in February 1996 for another round of patrols over Iraq.

During October 1995, the wing designation was changed to 192nd Fighter Wing. At the direction of the commander of Air Combat Command, in January, the 192nd also became a test regional repair center for F-16 engines. The 18-month assignment called for the 192nd propulsion section to strip and rebuild General Electric F110-GE-100 engines for its own F-16s as well as for active duty F-16s assigned to Pope AFB, North Carolina. The Air Force aimed to reduce the number of F-16 maintenance workers, consolidate their training, reduce duplication of resources, and lower maintenance costs per flying hour. The 192 FW was also selected to test the capability of electro-optical "recce" pods. After becoming mission capable with the pods in April 1996, the fighter wing deployed to Aviano AB, Italy, in May 1996 for the first contingency use of the new pods and computerized imaging equipment. For 45 days, the 192 FW flew "recce" missions over Bosnia to support international peacekeeping efforts. In December 1996, the wing was awarded its second Air Force Outstanding Unit Award.

In December 2000, 29 members of the 192nd deployed to Southwest Asia in support of Operation Southern Watch. In addition to Turkey and Kuwait, they were deployed to Prince Sultan Air Base (aircraft, pilots and maintainers) and Eskan Village, Saudi Arabia (pilots assigned to CAOC duty); Aviano Air Base, Italy; and Qatar. Also in December, the 192nd deployed on its first Aerospace Expeditionary Force (AEF) assignment. A 130-person detachment went to Curaçao in the Netherlands Antilles as part of Operation Coronet Nighthawk, an effort to stop drug smuggling into the United States.

On 21 September 2000, the 192nd hosted a reunion for the 352nd Fighter Group, the highly decorated World War II unit to which the 192nd's 149th Fighter Squadron traces its military lineage. More than 100 World War II veterans and nearly 300 of their family members attended.

In the wake of September 11, 2001, more than 400 unit members were called to active duty for up to two years, marking a period of prolonged intensity at the Richmond Air National Guard Base, unmatched since the Berlin call-up of 1961–62. Beginning in mid-September, combat air patrols were flown day and night for 218 consecutive days until mid-April 2002 for a total of 820 operational sorties and 3,515.5 flying hours. To support 24-hour-a-day operations, the unit installed three alert trailers for F-16 crews, and set up on-base laundry facilities, a mini-Base Exchange (BX), and a small gymnasium.

In September and October 2003, in support of Operation Iraqi Freedom, the 192nd Fighter Wing deployed more than 300 personnel to an undisclosed base in Southwest Asia.

In late 2007, pursuant to BRAC 2005 action, the 192 FW relinquished its F-16C and F-16D aircraft and moved to Langley AFB (now Joint Base Langley-Eustis), to integrate with the Regular Air Force as an associate unit to the 1st Fighter Wing (1 FW) flying the F-22 Raptor. The former Richmond International Airport Air National Guard Station property was transferred to the Department of the Army in support of U.S. Army Reserve and Virginia Army National Guard activities.

On 13 October 2007, the order to reactivate the 192 FW was read by Lieutenant Colonel Dave Kolmer at the activation ceremony held at the 27th Fighter Squadron, Langley AFB. Integration with the active duty 1 FW allows the Air National Guard to be at the forefront of the latest design of fighter aircraft, jointly flying and maintaining F-22 aircraft assigned to the 1st Fighter Wing.

On 1 October 2018, the 192nd Fighter Wing redesignated as the 192nd Wing by order of the Secretary of the Air Force. The wing held a ceremony on 13 October 2018, at Joint Base Langley-Eustis, bringing down the old wing flag for the last time and raising the new one. With 12 distinct mission sets including F-22 fighter jet operations and maintenance, intelligence and cyber operations along with multiple support units, the redesignation reflects the wing's growth and diversity.

Lineage
 Constituted as 192nd Tactical Fighter Group, and allotted to Virginia ANG, 1962
Extended federal recognition and activated, 15 October 1962
Re-designated: 192nd Fighter Group, 15 March 1992
Re-designated: 192nd Fighter Wing, 11 October 1995
Inactivated: 30 September 2007
Activated on 13 October 2007
Re-designated: 192nd Wing, 1 October 2018

Assignments
 Virginia Air National Guard, 15 October 1962
Gained by: Tactical Air Command
Gained by: Air Combat Command, 1 June 1992 – 30 September 2007
Virginia Air National Guard, 13 October 2007
Became associate unit of 1st Fighter Wing, 13 October 2007
Gained by Air Combat Command

Components
 192nd Operations Group, 11 October 1995 – 30 September 2007; 13 October 2007 – present
 149th Tactical Fighter (later Fighter) Squadron, 15 October 1962 – 30 September 2007; 13 October 2007 – present
192nd Mission Support Group
192nd Medical Group
192nd Maintenance Group

Stations
 Richmond International Airport, Virginia, 15 October 1962
 Langley AFB (later:Joint Base Langley-Eustis), Virginia, 13 October 2007 – present

Aircraft

 B-26 Invader, 1954–1958
 F-84F Thunderstreak, 1962–1971
 F-105D Thunderchief, 1971–1982
 A-7D Corsair II, 1982–1992

 F-16C Fighting Falcon, 1992–2007
 F-22A Raptor, 2007–present

References

Further reading
 Rogers, B. (2006). United States Air Force Unit Designations Since 1978. 

Wings of the United States Air National Guard
Military units and formations in Virginia
192